St. Alphonsus Church, Rectory, Convent and Halle, also known as St. John Neumann Shrine and "Baltimore's Powerhouse of Prayer," is a historic Roman Catholic church complex located within the Archdiocese of Baltimore in Baltimore, Maryland, United States. Since 1992, the parish has held regular Tridentine Masses. It is currently administered by the Priestly Fraternity of Saint Peter.

Description 
The church is based on the design of St. Stephen's Cathedral in Vienna and follows a basilica floorplan. The structure is constructed of red brick with limestone accents in the Gothic Revival style. A  gold cross caps the steeple.

The Halle is a -story brick structure also in the Gothic Revival style opposite the church across Saratoga Street.  It features a center entrance housed in projecting square bay topped by a gable. The adjacent three-story convent and the four-story rectory simple Georgian townhouses of brick.  The complex was constructed between 1842 and 1845 and was the first major design by Baltimore architect Robert Cary Long Jr.  From its founding until 1917, the parish was overseen by the Redemptorist Fathers whose members came to Baltimore to minister to the growing German immigrant community. John Neumann was one of the early pastors of St. Alphonsus prior to becoming Bishop of Philadelphia in 1852.  He was canonized on June 19, 1977.  Neumann's assistant pastor, Francis Xavier Seelos, served as pastor after his departure and later worked in areas from Connecticut to Illinois and New Orleans.  Seelos was beatified on April 9, 2000.

By 1917, many of the German immigrants who lived in the area moved elsewhere and St. Alphonsus became a parish for the Lithuanian immigrant community.
St. Alphonsus Church, Rectory, Convent and Halle was listed on the National Register of Historic Places in 1973.

Since 1992, the Tridentine Mass has been offered regularly at St. Alphonsus. Since 2017, the parish has been administered by the Priestly Fraternity of Saint Peter (FSSP), while remaining officially part of the Archdiocese of Baltimore.

Gallery

References

External links 

, including photo from 1991, at Maryland Historical Trust
St Alphonsus Church website
Explore Baltimore Heritage – St. Alphonsus Church
Roman Catholic Archdiocese of Baltimore

Convents in the United States
Downtown Baltimore
German-American culture in Baltimore
Lithuanian-American culture in Baltimore
Roman Catholic churches in Baltimore
Properties of religious function on the National Register of Historic Places in Baltimore
Roman Catholic churches completed in 1844
Gothic Revival church buildings in Maryland
Churches on the National Register of Historic Places in Maryland
1842 establishments in Maryland
19th-century Roman Catholic church buildings in the United States